The 1999 Cincinnati Reds season was the 130th season for the franchise in Major League Baseball. During the season the Reds became a surprising contender in the National League Central, winning 96 games and narrowly losing the division to the Houston Astros, ultimately missing the playoffs after losing a tie-breaker game to the New York Mets. As of 2019, the 1999 Reds currently hold the Major League record for the most wins by a team that failed to reach the playoffs in the Wild Card era.

Offseason
November 5, 1998: Melvin Nieves was released by the Cincinnati Reds.
November 10, 1998: Bret Boone was traded by the Cincinnati Reds with Mike Remlinger to the Atlanta Braves for Rob Bell, Denny Neagle, and Michael Tucker.
November 11, 1998: Paul Konerko was traded by the Cincinnati Reds to the Chicago White Sox for Mike Cameron.
December 21, 1998: Steve Avery was signed as a free agent with the Cincinnati Reds.
February 2, 1999: Mark Sweeney was traded by the San Diego Padres with Greg Vaughn to the Cincinnati Reds for Damian Jackson, Reggie Sanders, and Josh Harris (minors).

Regular season

Opening Day starters

Summary
In the May 19 contest versus the Colorado Rockies, the Reds won by a 24−12 final, tied for the fourth-highest run-scoring output in MLB history.  The Reds' Jeffrey Hammonds hit three home runs this game; following the season, Colorado acquired him via trade.  Both Hammonds and Sean Casey totaled four hits.  Casey was on base seven times with three walks, and hit two home runs and six RBI.  The Reds totaled six home runs; Casey added two, and Brian Johnson one.  Colorado's Larry Walker and Dante Bichette both had four hits.  Bichette also had five RBI, and Vinny Castilla hit a three-run home run.

Season standings

Record vs. opponents

Transactions
June 2, 1999: Ben Broussard was drafted by the Cincinnati Reds in the 2nd round of the 1999 amateur draft. Player signed June 2, 1999.
August 4, 1999: Jason Bere was released by the Cincinnati Reds.

Roster

Player stats

Batting

Starters by position
Note: Pos = Position; G = Games played; AB = At bats; H = Hits; Avg. = Batting average; HR = Home runs; RBI = Runs batted in

Other batters
Note: Pos = Position; G = Games played; AB = At bats; H = Hits; Avg. = Batting average; HR = Home runs; RBI = Runs batted in

Pitching

Starting pitchers
Note: G = Games pitched; GS = Games started; IP = Innings pitched; W= Wins; L = Losses; K = Strikeouts; ERA = Earned run average; WHIP = Walks + Hits Per Inning Pitched

Other pitchers
Note: G = Games pitched; GS = Games started; IP = Innings pitched; W = Wins; L = Losses; ERA = Earned run average; SO = Strikeouts

Relief pitchers
Note: G = Games pitched; W = Wins; L = Losses; SV = Saves; ERA = Earned run average; SO = Strikeouts

Awards and honors
 Scott Williamson, National League Rookie of the Year
 Sean Casey, Hutch Award
 Jack McKeon, National League Manager of the Year

Legacy

The 96 wins by the 1999 Cincinnati Reds were the most since the 1976 Big Red Machine who compiled 102 victories en route to their second consecutive World Series title. The Reds would not reach the 90-win plateau again until the 2010 season, when the team won the National League Central title with 91 victories.

The 1999 team is regarded as one of the best teams not to make the playoffs. Since the switch to 162 game season in 1962, the Reds have the sixth-best record, only to not make the playoffs at 96-67.

Notable Records

The team scored 865 runs, which still stands as the franchise record for runs scored in a season. The team also set franchise highs in most runs batted in (820), most total bases (2,549), and highest slugging percentage (.451)

On May 19, 1999, the Reds set three franchise records when they collected 28 hits, 15 extra base hits, and 55 total bases in a 24–12 victory over the Colorado Rockies. Sean Casey and Jeffrey Hammonds also set individual franchise records with each scoring five runs.

On September 4, 1999, the Reds set a franchise record when they clubbed nine home runs in a 22–3 victory over the Philadelphia Phillies. Eight different Reds players homered in the game, the only time since 1901 that a team has achieved this.

Farm system

References

1999 Cincinnati Reds season at Baseball Reference

Cincinnati Reds seasons
Cincinnati Reds Season, 1999
Cinc